Marcia de Braga (April 14, 1937 – March 24, 2010) was an American politician who served in the Nevada Assembly from the 35th district from 1992 to 2002.

She died on March 24, 2010, in Fallon, Nevada at age 72.

References

1937 births
2010 deaths
Democratic Party members of the Nevada Assembly